The Party for Neighbourly Love, Freedom, and Diversity or The Charity, Freedom and Diversity Party (Partij voor Naastenliefde, Vrijheid en Diversiteit, PNVD) was a Dutch political party with no representation in parliament, and only three known members .  It is commonly called the "pedopartij" ("pedo party") in the media, due to its advocacy for legalization of child pornography and the lowering of the age of consent. PNVD was originally founded on 31 May 2006 by three self-described pedophiles.  Its motto is "sapere aude" ("Have courage to use your own reason").  PNVD has not participated in any election. In 2006, it did not receive the 30 signatures from each of the 19 Dutch electoral regions it would need to get on the ballot for the 2006 elections. On 14 March 2010, the party was dissolved.

The party was restarted on 7 August 2020, with its website. Its former leader Marthijn Uittenbogaard has announced he will not be a part of the party.

Platform
According to their official statement, the PNVD's platform aimed to maximize diversity and liberty. They proposed allowing individuals, from the age of 12, to vote, have sex, gamble, choose their place of residence, and use soft drugs. Hard drugs would be legal at 16, as that would be the new age of majority. They also intended to eliminate marriage in the law, permit public nudity anywhere in the country, make railway travel free, and institute a comprehensive animal rights platform. They were opposed to immigration and religious elementary schools.

Sexuality
The PNVD sought to have the legal age of consent lowered to 12, and, in the long run, completely eliminated (except in dependent or intrafamilial relationships). They reason that only "coerced" or "dangerous" sexual activity should be punished. They also aimed to equalize the legal age where one can perform in pornography with the legal age of consent. Prostitution would be legal at the age of 16. The PNVD wanted to legalise private use of child pornography (calling outlawing thereof "censorship" in the platform) and allow non-violent pornography to be screened on daytime television. Their platform also included legalization of humans engaging in sex with animals.

Treasurer Van den Berg claimed that, "Rearing is also about introducing children to sex". Because of their controversial viewpoints on children and sexuality, they were often called the "paedo-party" by the people and in the media.

Also, the party's platform called for separate imprisonment facilities for sex offenders, arguing that the country would otherwise have indirect torture laws.

Animal rights
The PNVD ultimately aimed to establish a universal treaty guaranteeing all animals basic rights.

In addition, the party planned to heavily restrict animal testing and completely prohibit the consumption of meat and fish: they viewed the killing of animals, no matter what purpose it serves, as murder. Industries currently depending on the sale of animal meat would receive provisional financial support from the government. Hunting and fishing for sport would also be banned. The party also supported laws criminalizing the "sexual maltreatment" of animals.

Controversy and legal challenges
Many of the party's positions, particularly those involving children, were widely unpopular among the Dutch public. In a May 2006 opinion poll, 82% of respondents wanted the Dutch government to stop the party from competing in the elections. The anti-pedophile foundation "Soelaas" petitioned the courts to ban the party, but the judges ruled in the PNVD's
favour. "The freedom of expression, the freedom of assembly and the freedom of association … should be seen as the foundations of the democratic rule of law and the PNVD is also entitled to these freedoms," the court said in a statement.

The party's ties to paedophile activism have also drawn much attention: Marthijn Uittenbogaard (who also starred in the controversial documentary Are All Men Pedophiles?) was earlier the treasurer of Vereniging MARTIJN, an organization which advocates romantic and sexual relationships between adults and children, and all of its founders have identified as pedophiles. The treasurer, Ad van den Berg (then 43), was convicted in 1987 for a relationship with an eleven-year-old boy. He was fined and given a suspended prison sentence. The Dutch television show "Netwerk" monitored Van den Berg for three months. They discovered that he still has an under-age boyfriend.

In June 2006, Norbert de Jonge was expelled from his special education course at the Radboud University Nijmegen, owing to his involvement with the party and identification as a pedophile.

The party's name was abbreviated as NVD at its formation, but shortly thereafter, the security company  sought a legal order to have the party change their initials, saying that the party using the same abbreviation violated their trademark and harmed their reputation. The challenge was successful, and the party changed its initials to PNVD.

See also

 Joop Wilhelmus
 NAMBLA

References

External links

Pedophile advocacy
Political parties established in 2006
Political parties disestablished in 2010
Political controversies in the Netherlands
Political parties established in 2020
Political parties in the Netherlands
Eurosceptic parties in the Netherlands
Libertarian parties in the Netherlands